Events in the year 1937 in Norway.

Incumbents
 Monarch – Haakon VII
 Prime Minister – Johan Nygaardsvold (Labour Party)

Events
 29 May – Stavanger Airport, Sola is opened by King Haakon VII
 Municipal and county elections are held throughout the country.
 A flash flood destroys 20 houses in the Sima Valley, Hordaland. No lives are lost.

Popular culture

Sports

Music

Film

Literature

Notable births

 
 4 January – Harald Barlie, Greco-Roman wrestler
 4 January – Ole Kristian Grimnes, historian
 4 January – Per Tresselt, diplomat
 11 February – Ola Teigen, politician (died 1970)
 17 February – Bjørn Wiik, physicist (died 1999)
 18 February – Halle Jørn Hanssen, television correspondent, development aid administrator and politician
 21 February – Harald V, King of Norway
 22 February – Bjarte Eikeset, jurist and politician
 23 March – Per Olav Wiken, sailor and Olympic silver medallist
 13 April – Berge Furre, historian, theologian and politician
 15 April – Johan J. Jakobsen, politician and Minister
 18 April – Arne Alsåker Spilde, politician
 21 April – Henrik Jahre, politician
 7 May – Gullow Gjeseth, Army officer (died 2017. 
 11 May – Per Brunvand, newspaper editor
 24 May – Fredrik Torp, architect
 2 June – Geir Kjetsaa, professor of Russian literary history, translator and author (died 2008)
 28 June – Odd Bergh, triple jumper and long jumper
 4 July – Queen Sonja of Norway
 29 July – Pål Bang-Hansen, actor, film producer, film critic and television personality
 3 August – Gudrun Waadeland, actress and theatre director
 20 August – Kjell Hovik, pole vaulter
 4 September – Per Risvik, politician
 6 September – Tom Veierød, civil servant
 13 September – Alv Gjestvang, speed skater and Olympic silver medallist
 14 September – Dag C. Weberg, politician
 18 September – Per Flatberg, environmentalist and pharmacist
 24 September – Børre Knudsen, Lutheran minister and anti-abortion activist
 26 September – Aud Blattmann, politician
 16 October – Reidar Hjermstad, cross country skier
 17 October – Svein Johannessen, chess player, became Norway's second International Master (died 2007)
21 October – Johan Fredrik Heyerdahl, publisher and secretary general (died 2021).
31 October – Per Øien, flutist (died 2016).    
 14 November – Bjørn Bang Andersen, shot putter
 23 November – Turi Widerøe, Norway's first female air transport pilot
 29 November – Johan Jørgen Holst, politician and Minister (died 1994)
 1 December – Bodolf Hareide, politician
 3 December – Willy Rasmussen, javelin thrower
 8 December – Arne Næss, Jr., businessman and mountaineer (died 2004)
 23 December – Arne Larsen, Nordic combined skier and World Champion
 24 December – Ola Wærhaug, biathlete, Olympic silver medallist and World Champion
 29 December – Hjalmar Inge Sunde, military officer
30 December – Einar Johan Rasmussen, ships engineer and ship owner.
 31 December – Bjørn Rønningen, children's writer

Full date unknown
 Jan Balstad, politician and Minister
 Knut Boye, civil economist (died 2008)
 Ronald Bye, politician and Minister
 Nils Petter Faarlund, mountaineer.
 Øyvind Gustavsen, civil servant
 Einfrid Halvorsen, politician
 Knut Hartvig Johannson, businessperson
 Arild Nyquist, novelist, poet, children's writer and musician (died 2004)
 Oddrunn Pettersen, politician and Minister (died 2002)
 Gudmund Restad, politician and Minister
 Wenche Frogn Sellæg, politician and Minister

Notable deaths

 7 January – Hjalmar Nygaard, boxer (born 1900)
 19 July – Sigurd Asserson, civil servant (born 1882)
 27 July – Hans Dahl, painter (born 1849)
 27 October – Harald Pettersen, businessperson and politician (born 1869)
 14 November – Harald Stormoen, actor (born 1872)
 23 December – Nils Collett Vogt, poet (born 1864)

See also

References

External links